Drayson Racing (known as Drayson Racing Technology) is a British motor racing team founded by Paul Drayson to compete in the British GT Championship. Since then the team has run in the American Le Mans Series, Asian Le Mans Series and the 24 Hours of Le Mans. The team and its technology development sister company Drayson Technologies has been developing hardware for the electric racing series, FIA Formula E Championship.

24 Hours of Le Mans results

External links
 
 

British auto racing teams
Auto racing teams established in 2007
2007 establishments in the United Kingdom
24 Hours of Le Mans teams
American Le Mans Series teams
European Le Mans Series teams